MI-18 may refer to:
Mil Mi-8, Soviet helicopter

M-18 (Michigan highway)
MI18 (Directorate of Military Intelligence), an unused or classified section of the United Kingdom Directorate of Military Intelligence